The St. Paul Rangers were a minor professional ice hockey team based in Saint Paul, Minnesota. They were one of the original five teams of the Central Professional Hockey League. They were an affiliate of the National Hockey League's New York Rangers.

Their name was changed to the Minnesota Rangers in 1965 after the neighbouring city of Minneapolis lost its Central League team. The Rangers, though, continued to play in St. Paul. In 1966 the Rangers moved their farm team to Omaha, Nebraska in anticipation of the debut of the NHL's Minnesota North Stars in 1967.

The Rangers won the Adams Cup in 1964-65.

Season-by-season record 
Note: GP = Games played, W = Wins, L = Losses, T = Ties, Pts = Points, GF = Goals for, GA = Goals against, PIM = Penalties in minutes

References

Central Professional Hockey League teams
1963 establishments in Minnesota
1966 disestablishments in Minnesota
Ice hockey clubs established in 1963
Ice hockey clubs disestablished in 1966
Defunct ice hockey teams in Minnesota